The Ersu language proper ( Ěrsū) is a Sino-Tibetan (Trans-Himalayan language) spoken in western Sichuan, China. It is the most widely spoken of the three Ersu languages. There are 13,000 speakers according to Sun (1982).

Varieties
Yu (2012) lists three varieties of Ersu, all of which are spoken in southern Sichuan.

Zeluo Ersu: Sun (1982, 1991) documents Ersu of Zela Township 则拉乡 (or Zeluo 则洛), Yutian District 玉田区, Ganluo County 甘洛县, Sichuan (Sun 1991:231).
Qingshui Ersu: The Qingshui dialect of Ersu documented by Liu (1983) is spoken in Qingshui Village 清水村, Liaoping Township 廖坪乡, Ganluo County 甘洛县, Sichuan.
Hanyuan Ersu (extinct): Ersu of Hanyuan County, Sichuan, which is now extinct, was documented in Baber (1882).

Classification
In older literature, Ersu is categorized as a member of the southern subgroup of the Qiangic branch within the Trans-Himalayan language family. However, more recent work by Jacques & Michaud(2011) and Chirkova (2012) suggests that "the Qiangic group as defined is paraphyletic, as the only commonalities between these languages are either symplesiomorphies (common archaisms) or areal features spread through contact. At least Ersu/Lizu and Shixing should be excluded from the Qiangic group."

History 
There is generally few written records available in Ersu, therefore not much is known about the history of the people who spoke it. While it has been theorized that the Ersu people moved from Tibet, or were from neighbouring ethnic groups such as the Yi, there is some evidence that the Ersu predated even the Yi in settlement in that area. The Yi people who moved during the Tang Dynasty to the regions near where the Ersu resided documented the Ersu as "the aboriginals". Therefore, it is argued that the Ersu people's settlement in the place they can be found now must be no later than the beginning of the Tang Dynasty.

Orthography 
Most of the early Ersu people could not read or write since there are no written scripts to represent their vernacular language. The only ones who were literate were the religious practitioners called "Shaba".

Shaba were believed to  "know everything in the sky above and the  earth underneath", and possessed magical powers that allowed them  to chant scriptures to call for rain or curse the enemies of the Ersu.  They are still active in the Ersu communities to the present day.  They are always present at important events such as festivals, weddings, and funerals.

They are also important most likely because they were the only group of people who were able to read the only form of written script found in Ersu history. It is currently known as Shaba pictographic script. The not much is known about the script, only that it used to be only taught from father to son (not daughter) in a Shaba family. Now, there are less than 10 people who can read the script and much fewer who can understand it in the region.

There are about 200 independent Shaba characters which are not directly linked to the Ersu people's spoken language, and one character may correspond with one or more syllables. Often it may take several lines of words to explain one character. Each aspect of the "picture" would convey a meaning. Different animals would usually indicate different months or dates. Colors also conveyed meaning. They often matched the "five elements" as follows: metal is dark, wood is green, water is dark grey, fire is red, and earth is yellow.

Phonology

Consonants 
Ersu has 37 simple initial consonants and 22 cluster initial consonants. Besides the ones found in Mandarin loanwords, there are no syllabic final consonants.

The following table shows the phonological system of speakers of about age 50 and younger. All the sounds represented below are word initial except the nasals, which can also occasionally be used as an independent syllable.

There are 22 cluster initials, eighteen of which are composed of two consonants and four are composed of 3 consonants. They are as follows:

There are also some restrictions on what vowels the cluster initials can precede and are generally more limited than the number of vowels that the simple consonants can precede.

More on allophones of these consonants can be found in Zhang, S.'s 2013 dissertation.

Vowels 
Their vowel system includes seven basic vowels, three rhotic vowels, six diphthongs, and one triphthong. Ersu does not have nasalized vowels, however, there are nasalized vowels in loan words from Chinese. There are no long vowels.

The seven basic vowels are: /i/, /y/, /u/, /ɛ/, /ə/, /ɑ/ and /o/. The three rhotic vowels are: /ɑʴ/, /əʴ/, and  /oʴ/.

There are also six diphthongs, three rising and three falling. The three rising diphthongs are /iɛ/, /iɑ/ and /uɑ/. The three falling diphthongs end with a less prominent front vowel /i/, but begin with a more prominent vowel. They are: /ui/, /ɛi/, and /ɑi/. All of the diphthongs besides /uɑ/ are not frequently found in Ersu, only in a few individual words. /uɑ/ is found in a large number of words, following a variety of consonant initials such as  /kʰ/, /k/, /n/, /ŋ/, /l/, /tsʰ/, /ʂ/, and /x/.

/uɑo/ is the only triphthong found in Ersu, and only to exist in one word [zuɑo] 'bowl'.

Syllable Structure and Types 
The basic syllable pattern is CV. C can be a single consonant or consonant cluster. V can be a single vowel, diphthong, or triphthong. Native words of Ersu do not contain coda consonants. Each syllable will have a nucleus that is a vowel, diphthong, or triphthong, and very rarely a syllabic nasal.

Often a syllable can be simply V or C. The vowels /ɑ/, /ɑɹ/ and /əɹ/ can function as a syllable V. Nasals /m/, /n/, and /ŋ/ can also form independent syllables as C, however they are much rarer.

Lastly, there is the NCV pattern, which refers to nasalized syllables, where the N stands for a nasal /n/ or /m/. The rest of the structure is the same as the basic CV structure above.

Tones 
The tone bearing unit is a syllable, and each syllable is obligatorily assigned a tone. There are two tones with contrastive minimal pairs found in Ersu; high level, and mid level. The assignment of the tones in a particular morpheme or word is unpredictable, though data suggests that the high level tone is much more frequent than the mid level tone. The pitch contour of the Ersu tones is also much less stable/consistent compared to Mandarin Chinese, and often have contextual variation.

Below is an example of the contrastive minimal pairs of words with tonal differences. [`] marks the mid level tone, and nothing marks the high level tone.

Loanword Phonology 
There is strong evidence that Tibetan and Yi words have been borrowed into Ersu without adaptation. Some of the words have exactly the same pronunciation as the Tibetan or Yi words. There is some contention as to whether or not this is good enough evidence to say that Ersu people belong to the Tibetan nationality.

There is also a large amount of Mandarin words borrowed into the Ersu language. These words mainly come from the dialect in Mandarin that carries the tone systems of Southwestern Mandarin varieties, henceforth referred to as "Mandarin". According to Zhang, the majority of Mandarin loanwords occur in the texts relevant to modern times such as long conversations, procedural and autobiographical narratives. In a historical context, Mandarin is hardly seen, even as late as the 1980s.

Ersu generally utilize  Mandarin words in two different ways:
 Mandarin is directly borrowed without any adaptation, and is rather obvious. This leads to the use of nasalized vowels that are borrowed from Mandarin to appear in Ersu everyday speech, though it is not originally a part of their phonemic inventory.
 They assimilate Mandarin into Ersu by making the former sound very much like Ersu. This applies to words that have been borrowed for a longer time, and also the speech of the older Ersu speakers over 70 years old. Below are methods that Ersu adapts Mandarin words.

 Nasals in the coda of Mandarin are deleted when adapted, most likely due to the lack of codas in native Ersu.
 When there are diphthongs in Mandarin that are also in Ersu, they are directly borrowed. However, for the diphthongs that are in Mandarin and not in Ersu, only one of the vowels in the Mandarin diphthong is kept. Usually only the back vowel is kept. ex. /uo/ in Mandarin is adapted to keep the /o/ in the Ersu lexicon.
 /ə/ and /ɤ/ in Mandarin always becomes /o/ in Ersu.
 All the tones in Mandarin are transformed to the mid level tone in Ersu.
 Two notable exceptions are the adaptations of  Mandarin words for  'duck' and 'goose'. They are open syllables in Mandarin, but are adapted with a nasalized coda and a stressed glottal stop at the onset of the word.

Nouns 
Nouns in Ersu are either monomorphemic or compounded and can be derived from verbs or verb phrases through nominialization. Nominalizers come in the form of markers on words such as the agentive marker su, purposive marker li, temporal/locative marker ʂə`, and the instrumental/locative marker ta. Many kinship terms and directional terms take an ɑ-prefix. They may also bear case markers such as the genitive marker yɪ, accusative marker vɑ, comitative marker phɛ, etc. Finally there are six relator nouns found in Ersu that follow a head noun and denote either locative or temporal concepts.

Numeral system 

There are ten cardinal numerals 1-10 and the remainder being compound numerals. Unlike many other languages, Ersu does not have a "zero":

Compound numerals are formed for those numbers larger than ten. However, it is not just the sum of the cardinal numbers together to form the larger numbers. 
 numbers from 10 to 19 use base tsʰɛ (ten)
 numbers from 20 to 39 use base tsʰɿ (ten)
 numbers from 40 to 99 use base zɿ (ten)
 numbers larger than 100 are compounds often with three bases and there exists no base greater than ten thousand.

References

Bibliography
 Zhang, S. (2013). A reference grammar of Ersu: a Tibeto-Burman language of China (Doctoral dissertation, James Cook University).
 Chirkova, K. (2014). The Duoxu language and the Ersu-Lizu-Duoxu relationship. Linguistics of the Tibeto-Burman Area, 3(1), 104–146.
 Da, Wu (2005). Ersu Writing System and Ersu Ethnic Identity. Journal of The Central University For Nationalities (Philosophy and Social Sciences Edition), 6, 024.
 Liu, H. (1982). An outline of the Ersu language. In 15th International Conference on Sino-Tibetan Languages and Linguistics.
 Namkung, J. (1996). Phonological Inventories of Tibeto-Burman Languages. STEDT Monograph Series 3, xxvii+50.
 Yu, Dominic. 2012. Proto-Ersuic. Ph.D. dissertation. Berkeley: University of California, Berkeley, Department of Linguistics.

Articles in class projects/Rutgers
Qiangic languages
Languages of China